Sticks and Stones and Broken Bones is an album by the American band the Toll, released in 1991. The band supported the album by touring with the Ramones. The first single was "One Last Wish".

Critical reception

The Washington Post wrote that "the Toll has succeeded in fashioning a thoroughly mainstream American-rock sound that's subtly enlivened by deft borrowings from Britain." The Chicago Tribune noted that the "producer Matt Wallace also has worked with the Replacements and Faith No More, and The Toll fits perfectly midway between those two bands." The Roanoke Times opined that the "music is middle-of-the-road: heavy enough to satisfy headbangers but not blaring enough to produce headaches."

Track listing
"Tongue-Tied River" – 3:27
"Boys Are Bustin' Bricks" – 3:00
"One Last Wish" – 5:03
"Something 'Bout the Struggle" – 3:22
"Hear Your Brother Calling" – 6:02
"War Is Release" – 3:52
"Standing on the Ledge" – 5:05
"American Mess" – 5:13
"Happy" – 5:07
"Never Enough" – 4:41
"Colorblind" – 3:54
"Sweet Misery" – 7:08

All songs written by Brad Circone/Rick Silk/Brett Mayo/Greg Bartram

Personnel
Brad Circone - Vocals, Guitars, Harmonica, Piano
Rick Silk - Guitars, Vocals (background)
Brett Mayo - Drums, Vocals (background), Percussion
Greg Bartram - Bass, Vocals (background)
Becky Spaan - Vocals (background)
Brett B. - Raps
Todd Jasmin - Piano on "Sweet Misery"
Philip Cho - Reading on "American Mess"
Matt Wallace - Producer, Guitars, Vocals (background)
The Toll - Co-producer

References

The Toll albums
1991 albums
Geffen Records albums